Georgie Fame and the Blue Flames were a British rhythm and blues group during the 1960s whose repertoire spanned jazz, soul, ska, and calypso. 

They were originally the backing band for rock and roll singer Billy Fury. 

At the end of 1961, their piano player Georgie Fame took over as lead vocalist and they went on to enjoy great success without Fury. They  were influenced by Jon Hendricks, Mose Allison and blues musicians such as Willie Mabon. 

The group found other influences in ska, which could be heard in Jamaican cafes in and around Ladbroke Grove, England, and frequented by the group's Jamaican born trumpeter Eddie Thornton. During the group's three-year residency at The Flamingo Club, Fame heard the latest jazz and blues from America, and it was Booker T. & the M.G.'s recording "Green Onions" which inspired him to take up playing Hammond organ with the band.

History

Formation
Georgie Fame (then known as Clive Powell) and Colin Green had worked together in 'Colin Green's Beat Boys', who had backed Gene Vincent and Eddie Cochran during UK tours. In 1961, piano player Fame, drummer Red Reece, bassist Tex Makins and Green were hired by pop manager Larry Parnes to back Billy Fury as the Blue Flames. Fury's manager dismissed them in February 1962 as he felt they were "too jazzy" and replaced them with The Tornados.

1961–1963
In December 1961, Alan "Earl" Watson fronted the Blue Flames, playing tenor saxophone and singing. In May 1962, the group was augmented by Ghanaian percussionist Neeomi "Speedy" Acquaye and Green left the group. Fame took over as the lead vocalist, Green was replaced by Joe Moretti and in turn was later replaced by John McLaughlin. During that time Rod "Boots" Slade had taken over as bass player while Makins toured with Johnny Hallyday. Saxophonist Mick Eve joined the group during 1962 and eventually the line up was completed by Johnny Marshall.

McLaughlin departed in April 1963 when he joined The Graham Bond Organisation, leaving the group without a guitarist for 18 months and during this period Rik Gunnell took over the management of the band. In September 1963, they recorded their debut album Rhythm and Blues at the Flamingo which was produced by Ian Samwell, engineered by Glyn Johns and released on the Columbia label.

1964–1966

Rhythm and Blues at the Flamingo failed to enter the UK chart, as did the single "Do the Dog" which was taken from this album and released in 1964. Two other singles, "Do Re Mi" and "Bend a Little", were also released during 1964, achieving no commercial success.

In July 1964, Peter Coe replaced Marshall and was soon joined by baritone saxophonist Glenn Hughes and trumpet player Eddie "Tan-Tan" Thornton who had previously appeared occasionally with them and Green rejoined the group in October 1964.

Reece became ill in 1964 and was replaced by Tommy Frost. Jimmie Nicol spent a brief period as drummer, then left to replace Ringo Starr for 13 days on a Beatles tour. Phil Seamen and Micky Waller sat in for Nicol until Bill Eyden became the band's full-time drummer in September 1964.

In October 1964, the album Fame at Last reached No.15 in the U.K. album chart. The band's version of the song "Yeh, Yeh" was released as a single in the U.K. on 14 January 1965 and reached No.1 on the U.K. Singles Chart for two weeks (out of a total of twelve weeks on the chart).

The song "In the Meantime" was released as a single in February 1965 and reached the U.K. Top Twenty, however the band's next two single releases were not chart entries. Success followed with Fame's self penned song Get Away (released on 17 June 1966), which climbed to the top of the UK chart for a solitary week in late-July. The song was originally written as a jingle for a television petrol advertisement (National filling stations). It was later used as the theme tune for a long-running travel and lifestyle show on Australian television called Getaway. The two subsequent singles, "Sunny" and "Sitting in the Park" reached chart positions of No. 13 and No. 12 respectively. After the album Sweet Thing (1966) was released, Fame signed to CBS and became a solo artist.

Eyden and Makins remained as the group's rhythm section until they were replaced in December 1965 by Cliff Barton and Mitch Mitchell. That lineup recorded the album Sweet Things, then on 1 October 1966 Fame disbanded the Blue Flames to pursue a solo career. Within a week Mitchell had been selected over Aynsley Dunbar to be the third member of what would be called The Jimi Hendrix Experience.

Concert and appearances
The group were resident at a number of London clubs including The Whiskey-A-Go-Go, in Soho's Wardour Street and the Flamingo Club. In August 1963 the band took a weekly Friday night spot at The Scene on Great Windmill Street. They also performed at The Roaring Twenties club near Carnaby Street, run by Count Suckle. They did 22 midweek gigs at Klooks Kleek in 1964/65, The Ricky Tick in Windsor and The Scene, during week days.

In 1964, Fame and the band appeared on five episodes of ITV's Ready Steady Go!  Fame also appeared on television in 1965 in the New Musical Express Poll Winners' Concert held at the Empire Pool, Wembley on 11 April 1965, playing "Yeh, Yeh" and Rufus Thomas's "Walking the Dog".

Georgie Fame and the Blue Flames were the only act from the UK invited to perform with the first Motown Review in the UK during the mid-1960s. The Tamla Motown Package Show was a 21-date UK tour featuring amongst others, The Supremes, Stevie Wonder and Martha Reeves & the Vandellas.

On 26 December 1966, Fame, backed by the Blue Flames, opened the "Fame in '67' Show" alongside Cat Stevens and the show ran for two weeks at London's Saville Theatre.

In later years Fame was billed again with the Blue Flames and in the early 2000s he led a new line-up which included his son.

Georgie Fame and the Aussie Blue Flames

Fame ventured to Australia annually from 1977 to 1988 in order to play his music, and escape the English winter. Speaking to Kate Deamer of The Sydney Morning Herald, he explained that "there are several attractions to coming over, not least of which is the climate. Also, I've now got a very warm relationship with Australian musicians and look forward to coming out each year to play with them". Each year an all-Australian backing band was hired to accompany Fame on tour, who were "top Sydney Jazz musicians". For the 1980 tour, they were called The Thrill Seekers, and were led by a front line of Keith Stirling (trumpet), Col Loughnan (saxophones, flute), and Herb Cannon (trombone) with Steve Murphy (guitar), Greg Lyon (bass), and Willie Qua (drums) completing the line-up.

The next year the band changed their name to the Aussie Blue Flames, and Charlie Gould was the guitarist. Over the years, the band featured Dave Coulton (guitar, 1983), and Bob Johnson (trombone, 1987–88). In September 1988, Fame seconded the Aussie Blue Flames to Albert Studios in Sydney to record the album No Worries, borrowing from the Australian habit of saying "No worries" often. The musician credits were:

 Georgie Fame – vocals, keyboards
 Keith Stirling – flugelhorn, trumpet
 James Greening – trombone
 Col Loughnan – saxophone, flute
 Jimmy Doyle – guitar
 Greg Lyon – bass
 Russell Dunlop – drums
 Sunil D'Silva – percussion
The album was released in 1988, under the name "Georgie Fame" with no mention of the Aussie Blue Flames, on the Swedish label Four Leaf Clover.
Paul Speelman of The Age praised the touring band in 1988, saying, "One would be hard put to find many better combos in the world than this particular sextet of Aussie Blue Flames." Fame continued to tour in Australia until 2006; however the visits were more sporadic than before 1988.

Discography

References

British rhythm and blues musical groups